It's Not Dead Festival was a punk rock and ska music festival held at the San Manuel Amphitheater in San Bernardino, California. The festival featured three stages, a skate and BMX half-pipe ramp, and an art display. The festival was organized by Kevin Lyman, creator of Warped Tour and was first held in October 2015. Bands that performed at the festival included Bad Religion, Less Than Jake, T.S.O.L, and Left Alone.

It's Not Dead Festival 2 took place on August 26th 2017 with Rancid and Dropkick Murphys headlining the show. Other bands included The Adicts, Me First and the Gimmie Gimmies, The Interrupters and the Toasters.

References

External links
 

Music festivals in California
Tourist attractions in San Bernardino County, California
Culture of San Bernardino, California
Rock festivals in the United States